The  were held on 12 November 1936 in Taiwan under Japanese rule. In this time, 76 seats from five prefectural assemblies were open for election. Voting was done by Electoral colleges (EC) form by the 3,600 members of local assemblies. In this election, the first division of electoral districts were implemented in Taiwan.

Electoral College size 

Only around 0.073% of the population were eligible to vote in the election, which includes 743 (or 0.31% of) "Japan Mainlanders"  on Taiwan and 2,864 (or 0.061% of) "Taiwan Islanders" .

Result 
All 76 seats were elected. The overall turnout was at 98.97%, of which Taiwanese was higher than Japanese. 7 invalid electoral votes were found and 37 did not cast their votes. Amongst the elected prefectural assembly, 36 were Japanese and 40 were Taiwanese. The Governor-General then appointed 76 members, cementing the control of the Japanese in the assembly.

References 

 Mapstalk

1936
1936 in Taiwan
1936 elections in Asia